Roderick Mitchell Payne (22 January 1945 – 21 December 2019) was an Australian rules footballer who played with Melbourne in the Victorian Football League (VFL).

Notes

External links 		

		
		
		
1945 births
2019 deaths
Australian rules footballers from Victoria (Australia)		
Melbourne Football Club players
Prahran Football Club players